James Quigley is an Irish sportsperson.  He plays hurling with his local club Kiladangan and with the Tipperary senior inter-county team since 2021.

Career
Quigley made his league debut on 6 June 2021 against Westmeath when he came on as a late substitute.
He made his championship debut on 17 April 2022, starting against Waterford in the opening round of the 2022 Munster Hurling Championship.

Honours
Tipperary
Munster Minor Hurling Championship (1): 2015 (c)

Kiladangan
Tipperary Senior Hurling Championship (1): 2020

References

Tipperary inter-county hurlers
Living people
Year of birth missing (living people)